Events from the year 1979 in Ireland.

Incumbents
 President: Patrick Hillery
 Taoiseach:
 Jack Lynch (FF) (until 11 December 1979)
 Charles Haughey (FF) (from 11 December 1979)
 Tánaiste: George Colley (FF)
 Minister for Finance:
 George Colley (FF) (until 11 December 1979)
 Michael O'Kennedy (FF) (from 12 December 1979)
 Chief Justice: Tom O'Higgins
 Dáil: 21st
 Seanad: 14th

Events
 2 January – Today, the lowest temperature recorded in Ireland in the 20th century was −18.8 °C (−1.8 °F) at Lullymore, County Kildare. (The lowest on record in 1881 was −19.1 °C.)
 8 January – Whiddy Island Disaster: fifty people were killed when an explosion destroyed the French oil tanker Betelgeuse at the Gulf Oil terminal on Whiddy Island in Bantry Bay.
 4 March – Legendary hurler Christy Ring was buried in Cork.
 9 March – Taxpayers across the country took to the streets to protest against the tax system.
 20 March – A huge anti-taxation demonstration was held in Dublin.
 30 March – Ireland ended Irish pound parity with sterling on joining the European Monetary System.
 12 April – Patrick McGilligan, the last surviving member of the first government, celebrated his 90th birthday in Dublin. He died seven months later, on 15 November.
 10 May – Petrol shortages due to a crisis in the Middle East caused long delays at petrol stations in Ireland.
 2 June – Protesters opposed to the building of civic offices on the site of Viking excavations in Wood Quay, Dublin, occupied the area.
 7 June – European Parliament election, the first direct election to the European Parliament, in the Republic of Ireland and Northern Ireland.
 15 June – Aer Lingus's first female pilot, Gráinne Cronin, received her wings.
 14 July – In Crossmaglen, County Armagh, Gaelic Athletic Association (GAA) supporters paraded silently in protest against the British Army's commandeering of part of the local football pitch. Former GAA president Con Murphy addressed the crowd.
 9 August – The first group of Vietnamese refugees arrived in Ireland.
 27 August
 British retired Admiral Lord Mountbatten of Burma (a cousin to the Queen), and two 15-year-olds, his nephew and boatboy Paul Maxwell, were killed by a bomb planted on his boat in County Sligo where he was holidaying. The Dowager Lady Brabourne died the following day of her injuries.
 The Provisional Irish Republican Army (IRA) volunteers kill 18 British soldiers with two bombs in the Warrenpoint ambush.
 29 September – Pope John Paul II arrived at Dublin Airport for a three-day visit to Ireland. 1.25 million people, just over one-quarter of the population, welcomed him at a special mass in the Phoenix Park. Later in the day he spoke to 200,000 people at Drogheda, County Louth. He returned to Dublin in the evening where 750,000 people witnessed his motorcade passing through the city.
 30 September – The Pope addressed 285,000 people at a youth rally in Galway, before travelling to Knock, County Mayo where a further 300,000 people heard him speak. He also visited Clonmacnoise.
 1 October – On the final day of his visit, the Pope visited the Nunciature at Maynooth College and celebrated mass before 400,000 people in Limerick. He then left Shannon Airport for Boston in the United States.
 23 November – In Dublin, IRA member Thomas McMahon was sentenced to life imprisonment for the assassination of Lord Mountbatten.
 29 November – Taoiseach Jack Lynch greeted European Economic Community heads of government as they arrived for a summit meeting at Dublin Castle.
 5 December – Jack Lynch announced his resignation as Taoiseach and leader of Fianna Fáil. He had led the party for thirteen years, spending nine as Taoiseach.
 7 December
 Charles Haughey was elected leader of the Fianna Fáil party.
 The new headquarters of the Central Bank of Ireland were officially opened on Dame Street.
 11 December
 Charles Haughey was elected Taoiseach by Dáil Éireann.
 Máire Geoghegan-Quinn was appointed Minister for the Gaeltacht, the first woman to hold an Irish cabinet post since the Government of the 1st Dáil.
 31 December – 1979 was the worst year ever for industrial disputes in Ireland, costing the economy over 1,460,000 working days.
 Undated – The Central Bank of Ireland postponed the issue of a new £20 note, blue in colour, bearing an image of the poet William Butler Yeats until January 1980 due to financial problems.

Arts and literature
 17 March – Bob Quinn's feature film Poitín, starring Cyril Cusack and made entirely in Irish, premièred on RTÉ Television.
 31 May – Radio Telefís Éireann's national pop music radio station, RTÉ Radio 2, first aired; the old Radio Éireann was renamed RTÉ Radio 1.
 21 July – The Boomtown Rats' single "I Don't Like Mondays", written by Bob Geldof, was released in the United Kingdom.
 Crawford Art Gallery established as a separate institution in the former Cork Customs House on relocation of the Crawford College of Art and Design.
 Dublin City Council's Civic Offices, designed in brutalist style by Sam Stephenson.
 Thomas Flanagan's novel The Year of the French was published.
 John McGahern's novel The Pornographer was published.
 Kate Cruise O'Brien was awarded the Rooney Prize for Irish Literature for her short stories A Gift Horse.

Sport

Athletics
 John Treacy won the world cross-country championship for the second time.

Golf
 Carroll's Irish Open was won by Mark James (England).

Births
 14 January – Richard Sadlier, soccer player.
 16 January – Conor Cusack, Cork hurler.
 18 January – Leo Varadkar, Fine Gael TD and medical doctor.
 21 January – Brian O'Driscoll, captain of the Irish rugby union national team and captain of British & Irish Lions tour to New Zealand in 2005.
 25 January – Ben O'Connor, Cork hurler.
 25 January – Jerry O'Connor, Cork hurler.
 2 March – Damien Duff, footballer.
 14 March – Gary Duggan, playwright.
 20 March – Amy Huberman, actress and writer.
 6 April – Michael Kavanagh, Kilkenny hurler.
 13 April – Tony Lundon, dancer and singer.
 13 April – Síle Seoige, television presenter.
 4 May – Georgina Ahern, daughter of Bertie Ahern.
 9 May – Barry Quinn, soccer player.
 14 May – Ruby Walsh, National Hunt jockey.
 15 May – Mary Goode, hockey player.
 18 May – Justin Sheriff, hockey player.
 30 May – Colm Foley, soccer player.
 31 May – Kieran O'Connor, Cork Gaelic footballer (died 2020).
 13 June – Alan Quinn, soccer player.
 16 June – Declan O'Brien, soccer player.
 5 July – Shane Filan, lead singer with Westlife.
 31 July – Damien Lynch, soccer player.
 16 August – Brian Ormond, singer, contestant from Popstars, You're a Star and Pop Idol (series 2) and television host.
 28 August – Caoimhín Ó Raghallaigh, fiddle player.
 1 September
 James O'Connor, soccer player.
 Neil Ronan, Cork hurler.
 3 September – Kieran O'Reilly, Actor. 
 16 September – Barry Geraghty, jockey.
 21 September – Richard Dunne, soccer player.
 9 October – Chris O'Dowd, comedian and actor.
 17 October – Leigh Arnold, actress.
 20 October – Paul O'Connell, international rugby player.
 20 October – Brian Begley, Limerick hurler.
 1 November – Henry Shefflin, Kilkenny hurling player.
 9 November – Thos Foley, slalom skier.
 12 November – Cian O'Connor, equestrian.
 22 November – Chris Doran, singer.
 24 November – Kirsteen O'Sullivan, television presenter.
 25 November – David Freeman, soccer player.
 1 December – Pearse O'Neill, Cork Gaelic footballer.
 31 December – Elaine Cassidy, actress.

Full date unknown
 Raymond Daniels, Wicklow Gaelic footballer (died 2008).
 Cathy Davey, alternative rock singer-songwriter.
 Neil Delamere, comedian.

Deaths
 20 January – Billy McCracken, footballer and football manager (born 1883).
 21 January – T. C. Kingsmill Moore, senior counsel, represented Dublin University in the Seanad from 1943 to 1948 (born 1893).
 16 February – Jack Barrett, hurler (Kinsale, Cork, Munster) (born 1910).
 2 March – Christy Ring, hurler (Glen Rovers, Cork, Munster) (born 1920).
 18 April – Seán Brosnan, barrister, Fianna Fáil TD and Senator (born 1916).
 14 May – Peter Kerley, radiologist (born 1900).
 25 May – Desmond Clarke, librarian and writer (born 1907).
 29 May – Henry Coyle, Cumann na nGaedheal TD.
 2 August – John Leydon, Secretary, Department of Industry and Commerce.
 11 August – J. G. Farrell, novelist (born 1935).
 4 June – James Hamilton, 4th Duke of Abercorn, soldier and politician (born 1904).
 10 August – Joseph O'Doherty, Sinn Féin MP, Fianna Fáil TD and Seanad member (born 1891).
 10 September – Daniel Costigan, former Garda Síochána Commissioner.
 15 November – Patrick McGilligan, Cumann na nGaedheal/Fine Gael TD and Cabinet Minister (born 1889).
 17 December – Harold Jackson, cricketer (born 1888).

See also
1979 in Irish television

References

 
1970s in Ireland
Ireland
Years of the 20th century in Ireland